Baruch Leib Rosowsky (1841  –  1919) was a famous cantor of the Great Choral Synagogue in Riga and a composer of religious music in Riga, at the time a city in Imperial Russia. Rosowsky's time of death was during the Latvian War of Independence. His son was also a famous cantor, named Solomon Rosowsky. It is likely that Rosowsky's family is related to the Rasofsky branch of the Barney Ross family.

References

Notable Relatives 
Yuri Rasovsky
Solomon Rosowsky
Barney Ross

External links
musica-judaica.com, Rosowsky bio
AN INVENTORY OF THE SOLOMON ROSOWSKY COLLECTION, The Library of The Jewish Theological Seminary New York, 1996

1841 births
1919 deaths
Musicians from Riga
People from the Governorate of Livonia
Latvian Jews
Latvian composers
20th-century Latvian male singers
Hazzans
19th-century male singers from the Russian Empire